The fifth season of Top Gear began airing on History from June 3, 2014 until October 21, 2014. Adam Ferrera, Tanner Foust, Rutledge Wood and The Stig returned as hosts, with ten weekly episodes being broadcast.

Production
The fifth season began production in early 2014 premiered on June 3, 2014.

Episodes

References

External links
 Season 5 at the Internet Movie Database

Top Gear seasons
2014 American television seasons
2014 in American television